Chillahuita is a dacitic lava dome in northern Chile. It may have formed after the Pleistocene, although argon-argon dating on amphibole has indicated an age of 370,000 ±40,000 years. It formed in a single non-explosive eruption.

The flow moved northward and eastward from the vent over a terrain with slopes of 3-4°. It is surrounded by a pumice deposit probably from the San Pedro volcano to the northwest.

The eruption of the Chillahuita dome appears to have been controlled by local fault systems associated with the Altiplano-Puna volcanic complex, which also has geochemical similarity with Chillahuita lavas.

See also 
 Cerro Chao
 Cerro Chascon-Runtu Jarita complex

References

External links 

Volcanoes of Antofagasta Region
Pleistocene lava domes